Crossothamnus gentryi is a flowering tree in the family Asteraceae. It is found in Ecuador and Peru. Its natural habitat is subtropical or tropical moist montane forests. It is threatened by habitat loss.

References

Eupatorieae
Flora of Ecuador
Endangered plants
Taxonomy articles created by Polbot